Katharina Rensch (later Schirmer, born 7 October 1964) is a German retired gymnast.
She competed at the 1980 Summer Olympics in all artistic gymnastics events and won a bronze medal in the team competition. Her best individual result was sixth place in the vault. She won another bronze medal with the East German team at the 1979 World Artistic Gymnastics Championships.

References

External links
 Katharina Rensch (GDR) at Gymn-Forum.net
 

1964 births
Living people
Gymnasts from Berlin
German female artistic gymnasts
Olympic gymnasts of East Germany
Gymnasts at the 1980 Summer Olympics
Olympic bronze medalists for East Germany
Olympic medalists in gymnastics
Medalists at the 1980 Summer Olympics
Medalists at the World Artistic Gymnastics Championships
20th-century German women
21st-century German women